Philipp, Prince and Landgrave of Hesse (6 November 1896 – 25 October 1980) was head of the Electoral House of Hesse from 1940 to 1980.

He joined the Nazi Party in 1930, and, when they gained power with the appointment of Adolf Hitler as Chancellor in 1933, he became Oberpräsident of the Prussian Province of Hesse-Nassau. However, he later began to fall out of favour with Hitler in the spring of 1943 after delivering an honest assessment of the military situation in Italy. He was arrested in September 1943 on the day Italy surrendered to the western Allies, dismissed in the following year, and was sent to the Flossenbürg concentration camp, then Dachau, where he remained until being transported to Tyrol by the SS, where he was liberated by Wehrmacht forces on 30 April 1945 and then arrested by U.S. forces on 4 May 1945, being interned until 1947.

He was a grandson of Frederick III, German Emperor, and a great-grandson of Queen Victoria, as well as the son-in-law of Victor Emmanuel III of Italy. His relative Prince Philip, Duke of Edinburgh was named after him.

Early life
Philipp was born at Schloss Rumpenheim in Offenbach, the third son of Prince Frederick Charles of Hesse and of his wife Princess Margaret of Prussia (sister of the German Emperor Wilhelm II). Philipp had a younger twin brother Wolfgang, as well as two older brothers and two other younger twin brothers.

As a child, Philipp had an English governess. In 1910, he was sent to Britain to attend school in Bexhill-on-Sea. After returning to Germany, he attended a Musterschule in Frankfurt and then the Realgymnasium in Potsdam. He was the only one of the brothers who did not attend a military academy.

At the beginning of the First World War, Philipp enlisted in the Hessian Dragoon-Regiment Nr. 24 along with his older brother Maximilian. They served first in Belgium where Maximilian was killed in October.  In 1915 and 1916, Philipp served on the Eastern Front in what is now Ukraine. He held the rank of lieutenant (an extremely low rank considering his princely background) and was mostly responsible for the procurement of munitions. In 1917, he served on the Hindenburg Line, before returning to Ukraine where he experienced active combat and was wounded.

In 1916, Philipp's oldest brother Friedrich Wilhelm died (in World War I) and Philipp became second in line to succeed his uncle as Head of the Electoral House of Hesse. In October 1918, Philipp's father was elected king of Finland. It was intended that Philipp would eventually succeed his father as Head of the House of Hesse, while his (younger) twin brother Wolfgang would be heir to the Finnish throne.  The plans for a Finnish monarchy, however, soon came to an abrupt end with the defeat of Germany; Finland became a republic in July 1919.

After the war, Philipp enlisted in the Übergangsheer (the Transitional Army) which was successful in repressing communist and socialist action. From 1920 to 1922, he attended the Technical University in Darmstadt where he studied art history and architecture. He made several visits to Greece where his aunt Princess Sophie of Prussia was the wife of King Constantine I.  In 1922, he left university without completing a degree and took a job at the Kaiser-Friedrich-Museum in Berlin.  The following year, he moved to Rome where he used his aristocratic connections to establish himself as a successful interior designer. (He had designed some furniture for the palace his father intended to occupy as King of Finland.)

According to biographer Jonathan Petropoulos, Philipp was bisexual, and his lovers included the British poet Siegfried Sassoon.

Marriage and children
He married Princess Mafalda of Savoy, daughter of King Victor Emmanuel III of Italy, on 23 September 1925 at the Castello di Racconigi near Turin. The couple had four children:

Prince Moritz, Landgrave of Hesse (6 August 1926 – 23 May 2013) he married Princess Tatiana of Sayn-Wittgenstein-Berleburg on 1 June 1964 and they were divorced on 16 October 1974. They have four children and eleven grandchildren. 
Prince Heinrich Wilhelm Konstantin Viktor Franz of Hesse-Kassel (30 October 1927 – 18 November 1999).
Prince Otto Adolf of Hesse-Kassel (3 June 1937 Rome – 3 January 1998 Hanover) he married Angela von Doering (daughter of Bernd von Doering and ex-wife of Hans-Peter Schmiedler) on 5 April 1965 and they were divorced on 3 February 1969. He married Elisabeth Bonker on 28 December 1988 and they were divorced in 1994.
Princess Elisabeth Margarethe of Hesse-Kassel (8 October 1940 Rome, Italy) she married Count Friedrich von Oppersdorff on 28 February 1962. They have two sons.

The family lived mostly at Villa Polyxena (named after Queen Polyxena), part of Villa Savoia, the king of Italy's estate on the outskirts of Rome. But they also travelled frequently to Germany.

Involvement with the NSDAP

While in Italy, Philipp fell under the influence of Fascism, or otherwise believed the Bolsheviks to be a greater threat.  On his return to Germany in October 1930, he joined the National Socialist German Workers' Party.  In 1932, he joined the Stormtroopers (SA, commonly referred to as the Brown Shirts), and, the following year, his younger brother Christoph joined the Schutzstaffel (SS).  Later, his two other brothers, including Wolfgang, also joined the SA.  Through his party membership, Philipp became a particularly close friend of Hermann Göring, the future head of the German air force (Luftwaffe). In the Stormtroopers, he held the rank of Obergruppenführer.

Following the appointment of Adolf Hitler as the German Chancellor on 30 January 1933, Philipp was appointed Oberpräsident (Governor) of Hesse-Nassau in June 1933. With the electoral success of Hitler's political party, he also became a member of the Reichstag and of the Staatsrat of Prussia.  Philipp played an important role in the consolidation of National Socialist rule in Germany.  He introduced other aristocrats to NSDAP officials and, as son-in-law of the king of Italy, was a frequent go-between for Hitler and Benito Mussolini. He also acted as an art agent for Hitler in Italy. Philipp arranged the purchase of many important works of art for the large museum that Hitler was planning in Linz. For this purpose, the Reich Chancellery established a special account for him at the German Embassy in Rome, over which Prince Philipp could freely dispose. In 1940/41, German art purchases in Italy increased to such an extent that the Fascist government prohibited the sale of art treasures to foreigners in September 1941. On 11 March 1938, he delivered Hitler's letter of reassurance to Mussolini prior to Hitler's marching into Austria, and received a gushing call from Hitler upon the news of Mussolini's acquiescence.

As governor of Hesse-Nassau, Philipp was associated with the Aktion T4 euthanasia programme. In February 1941, Philipp signed the contract placing the sanitarium of Hadamar Clinic at the disposal of the Reich Interior Ministry. Over 10,000 mentally ill people were killed there. In 1946, Philipp was charged with murder, but the charges were later dropped.

As the war progressed, the attitude of the National Socialist authorities towards members of the German princely houses changed. While at first they had been happy to use the historic family names to bolster popular support, they now decided to distance themselves even from those princes who had supported them.

In late April 1943, Philipp was ordered to report to Hitler's headquarters, where he stayed for most of the next four months. In May 1943, Hitler issued the "Decree Concerning Internationally Connected Men" declaring that princes could not hold positions in the party, state, or armed forces. The arrest of Mussolini by Philipp's father-in-law King Victor Emanuel in July 1943 made Phillip's position even more difficult.

Hitler believed that Philipp and his family were complicit in Mussolini's downfall. On 8 September 1943, Philipp was arrested. He was stripped of his membership in the party and dismissed from the Luftwaffe. On 25 January 1944, his political disgrace became public when he was dismissed from his office as Oberpräsident of Hesse-Nassau.

In September 1943, Philipp was sent to Flossenbürg concentration camp. He was placed in solitary confinement and was not permitted any contact with the outside world. He was, however, granted certain privileges: wearing civilian clothes and eating the same food as the guards.

Philipp's wife Mafalda was arrested and placed under military custody in Rome. She was sent to Munich and Berlin for questioning and eventually to Buchenwald concentration camp where she was housed next to an armaments factory. In August 1944, the factory was bombed by the Allies. Mafalda was seriously injured and died several days later following a belated operation by camp medical staff.

As the Allies advanced into Germany in April 1945, Philipp was transferred to the Dachau concentration camp. After only ten days, he was transferred to Tyrol to Hotel "Bachmann" along with about 140 other prominent prisoners (for example Kurt Schuschnigg, Bogislaw von Bonin, Hjalmar Schacht, Martin Niemöller, Georg Thomas, and Alexander von Falkenhausen), freed by the Wehrmacht on 30 April 1945 (SS-Obergruppenführer Karl Wolff received a telephone call from the SS guards and ordered them to hand over the prisoners to the German army officers Hauptmann Wichard von Alvensleben and Hauptmann Gebhard von Alvensleben), and was then arrested by U.S. troops on 4 May 1945 in Niederdorf in the Italian Dolomites.

After the war
On account of his former position as Governor of Hesse-Nassau, Philipp was held by the Allies first on the island of Capri and then at a series of other detention centres until released in 1947.

On 28 May 1940, Philipp succeeded his father as Head of the Electoral House of Hesse.  In 1968, upon the death of his distant agnatic relative, Prince Louis of Hesse and by Rhine (who was also his second cousin as Philipp's mother and Louis' father were grandchildren of Queen Victoria), Philipp succeeded to the total headship of the entire House of Hesse, including grand ducal Hesse (Hesse and by Rhine/Hesse-Darmstadt). Louis had nominally adopted Philipp's son Moritz, who at that time inherited the Hessian and by-Rhine properties, including remarkable cultural collections: for the first time since the division of Hesse into branches after the death of Philip the Magnanimous in 1567, all the branches of the house of Hesse were reunited again.

Philipp died in Rome, Italy, in 1980.

Awards and decorations
1914 Iron Cross 2nd Class
1914 Iron Cross 1st Class
War Merit Cross (Brunswick)
General Honor Decoration (Hesse)
Order of Saint Alexander (Bulgaria)
1931 Brunswick Rally Badge c.1931
The Honour Cross of the World War 1914/1918 with Swords, c.1934
Anschluss Medal, c.1938
Golden Party Badge on 30 January 1939
Sudetenland Medal, c.1939
Honour Chevron for the Old Guard
Supreme Order of the Most Holy Annunciation
War Merit Cross 2nd Class without Swords
War Merit Cross 1st Class without Swords
Nazi Party Long Service Award in Bronze
Nazi Party Long Service Award in Silver

Ancestry

Notes

References

Further reading

 Jonathan Petropoulos, Royals and the Reich: The Princes von Hessen in Nazi Germany (Oxford University Press, 2006).
 Jobst Knigge, Prinz Philipp von Hessen. Hitlers Sonerbotschafter für Italien, Humboldt University Berlin (open access) 2009

|-

|-

1896 births
1980 deaths
People from Offenbach am Main
House of Hesse-Kassel
Bisexual men
Bisexual politicians
LGBT royalty
LGBT people in the Nazi Party
German twins
German princes
Royalty in the Nazi Party
Dachau concentration camp survivors
Flossenbürg concentration camp survivors
Heirs apparent who never acceded